Johnny Olson's Rumpus Room was a 1949-1952 American variety show hosted by Johnny Olson.

Broadcast history
The show aired at 10 am ET from January 17, 1949, to July 4, 1952, on the DuMont Television Network. 

The show was one of the first daytime television shows broadcast from New York City to DuMont's small network of East Coast cities. Olson also hosted the DuMont talent show Doorway to Fame (May 1947 – July 1949), and DuMont's Saturday-morning children's show Kids and Company (September 1951 – June 1952).

According to the book What Women Watched: Daytime Television in the 1950s (University of Texas Press, 2005) by Marsha Cassidy, the DuMont daytime schedule beginning in January 1949 was:

10-10:30 am   Johnny Olson's Rumpus Room
10:30-11 am  Welcome, Neighbors
11 am-12 noon  The Stan Shaw Show
12 noon-12:15 pm   Amanda
12:15-12:30 pm  Man in the Street
12:30-12:45 pm  Camera Headlines
12:45-1 pm   Fashions in Song
1-1:30 pm   Okay, Mother
2:30-3 pm  Inside Photoplay (The Wendy Barrie Show)
3-3:15 pm  The Needle Shop
3:15-3:30 pm  Vincent Lopez Speaking (The Vincent Lopez Show)

Olson's career
In the 1940s, Olson hosted a popular radio show also titled Johnny Olson's Rumpus Room at WTMJ in Milwaukee. Sometime after 1943, Johnny moved the show (WTMJ continued to air Rumpus Room with a new host) to WMAQ in Chicago as an evening variety show running 10:30 pm to 12 midnight (CT). Olson went on to become a famous announcer on American game shows, including as the announcer on The Price Is Right on CBS Television and first-run syndication from 1972 until his death (the nighttime version of The Price Is Right reunited Olson with another prominent DuMont personality, Dennis James, for its first five years on air).

See also
List of programs broadcast by the DuMont Television Network
List of surviving DuMont Television Network broadcasts
1949–50 United States network television schedule (weekday)

References

Further reading
David Weinstein, The Forgotten Network: DuMont and the Birth of American Television (Philadelphia: Temple University Press, 2004) 
Alex McNeil, Total Television, Fourth edition (New York: Penguin Books, 1980) 
Tim Brooks and Earle Marsh, The Complete Directory to Prime Time Network TV Shows, Third edition (New York: Ballantine Books, 1964)

External links
 
DuMont historical website

1949 American television series debuts
1952 American television series endings
1940s American variety television series
1950s American variety television series
Black-and-white American television shows
DuMont Television Network original programming
English-language television shows